Clathrin adaptor proteins, also known as adaptins, are proteins that mediate the formation of vesicles for intracellular trafficking and secretion. Adaptins are clustered subunits of adaptor protein (AP) complexes. There are several types of adaptin, each related to a different AP complex.

Adaptins show sequence similarity to some COPI subunits, thus they are thought to have a common evolutionary origin. The adaptin is a heterotetramer consisting of two large adaptins (beta and one other depending on the complex), a medium adaptin (mu), and a small adaptin (sigma):

 complex 1
 AP1B1
 AP1G1
 AP1G2
 AP1M1
 AP1M2
 AP1S1
 AP1S2
 AP1S3
 complex 2
 AP2A1
 AP2A2
 AP2B1
 AP2M1
 AP2S1
 complex 3
 AP3B1
 AP3B2
 AP3D1
 AP3M1
 AP3M2
 AP3S1
 AP3S2
 complex 4
 AP4B1
 AP4E1
 AP4M1
 AP4S1
 complex 5
 AP5Z1
 AP5B1
 AP5M1
 AP5S1

A diagram of the 5 complexes is shown here

References

 Alberts, Johnson, Lewis, Raff, Roberts, Walter: Molecular Biology of the Cell, 4th edition (2002), Garland Science.
 

Peripheral membrane proteins